Xavier Bertoni (born 4 May 1988 in La Clusaz) is a French Freestyle skier. He began skiing when he was two years old, and has been with Rossignol since 2004.

Results
3rd 2010 14th X Games, Aspen, Colorado, Superpipe
1st 2009 13th X Games, Aspen, Colorado, Superpipe
1st 2009       fis World Cup   Les Contamines, FRA             Halfpipe
6th 2008 	Tignes Airwaves 	Tignes, FRA 		Halfpipe
8th 2008 	fis World Cup 	Les Contamines, FRA 		Halfpipe
1st 2007 	NZ Freeski Open 	Lake Wanaka, NZL 	Halfpipe
3rd 2007 	World Skiing Invitational 	Whistler, BC CAN 	 Superpipe
4th 2007 	Tignes Airwaves 	Tignes, FRA 		Big Air

References

1988 births
Living people
French male freestyle skiers
X Games athletes
Superpipe skiers
Freestyle skiers at the 2014 Winter Olympics
Olympic freestyle skiers of France
Université Savoie-Mont Blanc alumni